Janet Hobhouse (March 27, 1948 – February 1, 1991) was an American novelist, biographer and editor. She is the author of four novels, including the posthumously published The Furies. Her first published work was a biography of Gertrude Stein, Everybody Who was Anybody. She was a contributing editor to ARTnews and also published a monograph on artists' representation of the female nude in the twentieth century. Born in New York City to Henry Hobhouse and Frances Liedloff, she attended the Spence School and Oxford University. Hobhouse was married to journalist and film maker Nick Fraser from January 18, 1974, until their divorce in 1983.

The Furies 
Hobhouse died in 1991 at the age of 42 from cancer. Her celebrated novel The Furies was published two years later. In the New York Times, Michiko Kakutani called the novel a “beautiful—and profoundly affecting—meditation on love and death and family.” In the Los Angeles Times, writer and critic Daphne Merkin described the reading experience as “extraordinary ...  a stunning heartbreaker of a book, shot through with pellucid sadness.”

In 2004, The Furies was reissued by New York Review of Books Classics, with an introduction by Merkin.

Works

 Everybody Who Was Anybody, 1976, a biography of Gertrude Stein
 Nellie Without Hugo, 1982, novel
 Dancing in the Dark, 1983, novel
 November, 1986, novel
 The Bride Stripped Bare: The Artist and the Female Nude in the Twentieth Century, 1988, non-fiction
 The Furies, 1992, novel

References

External links
 Janet Hobhouse's Archive at the Women's History Sources of Rutgers University

1948 births
1991 deaths
20th-century American novelists
20th-century American biographers
American women novelists
20th-century American women writers
Deaths from cancer in New York (state)
Alumni of the University of Oxford
Janet
Spence School alumni
Novelists from New York (state)